|}

The October Stakes is a Listed flat horse race in Great Britain open to mares and fillies aged three years or older.
It is run at Ascot over a distance of 7 furlongs (1,408 metres), and it is scheduled to take place each year in October.

Prior to 1994 the race was for three-year-olds only.

Winners since 1988

See also
 Horse racing in Great Britain
 List of British flat horse races

References 
Racing Post: 

Flat races in Great Britain
Ascot Racecourse
Mile category horse races for fillies and mares